Minoo Island is an Iranian island in the Khuzestan province (located in Persian Gulf), in southwestern Iran and is located between the cities of Abadan and Khorramshahr. The city of Minushahr is on the island. The island is comprehended entirely by the Minu District of Khorramshahr County.

Gallery

References 

Khorramshahr County
Islands of Iran
Landforms of Khuzestan Province